A motoring hood or driving hood was a women's fashion in the early 20th century whose purpose was to protect the wearer from dirt and dust while driving or riding in an automobile.

References

History of clothing (Western fashion)
1900s fashion
Headgear